Football Club Suvorovo are a Bulgarian association football club based in Suvorovo, Varna Province, currently playing in the North-East Third League, the third level of Bulgarian football.

Current squad 
As of 1 September 2019

League positions

External links
Official site

Football clubs in Bulgaria
Association football clubs established in 1945
1945 establishments in Bulgaria